This is a list of films which have reached number one at the weekend box office in the United Kingdom during 2014.

Films

References

2014
United Kingdom
2014 in British cinema